Malviran (also Romanized as Mālvīrān and Māl-e Vīrān; also known as Mālmīrān) is a village in Susan-e Gharbi Rural District, Susan District, Izeh County, Khuzestan Province, Iran. At the 2006 census, its population was 140, in 24 families.

References 

Populated places in Izeh County